Son Dam-bi (born September 25, 1983) is a South Korean singer, actress and entertainer. She began her career as a solo singer in 2007. She also made her acting debut in the 2009 Korean drama Dream.

Career
Son first came to fame when she appeared in a commercial for an MP3 player alongside Poppin' Hyun Joon.

Prior to her debut, MSN Japan made a video documentary capturing her pre-debut training and rehearsals, which attracted 480,000 visitors in five days. Son trained with a well-known American choreographer in preparation for this album, and people began calling her the female version of Rain.

Son's debut single features five tracks that show off her vocal and dancing talents. Her debut single, "Cry Eye", was produced and composed by Jang Joon-ho, who previously wrote MC Mong's "180 Degrees" and Jang Woo-hyuk's "Last Game". The lyrics were written by Brian Kim, who also penned Shinhwa's Once in A Lifetime.

Son joined MBC's reality show We Got Married, being paired with Marco in late 2008 as part of the second group of couples. Their last episode was on February 2, 2009.

It was also announced that Son would be part of the cast for Hype Nation, a film that has been labelled a "world movie".  However, as the movie was delayed, Son released an EL with the single "Toyoil Bamae" ("토요일 밤에", "On a Saturday Night"). The song became her first #1 hit, topping various on- and offline charts, including M! Countdown (within 20 days), two wins on KBS' Music Bank, and a three-week chart-topping run on SBS' Inkigayo.  The songs' routine features Son in various 80's fashions, transforming her into a "retro fashionista".

She then starred in SBS drama Dream with Joo Jin-mo and Kim Bum, marking her debut as an actress. As a result of her portrayal in Dream, as the Taebo instructor Park So-yeon, it won her the SBS Drama Awards New Star Award.

Return to South Korea
After training in the United States after "Cry Eye", Son returned to Korea and released an EP, Mini Album Vol.1, with a focus on electronica (departing from her previous style of crunk pop) on April 29, 2008. The lead single, titled "Bad Boy", was produced by Brave Brothers. Kahi (former leader of After School and Pledis labelmate) was her dance teacher and was featured in the "Bad Boy" music video.

In September 2008, she returned with the single "미쳤어" ("Crazy"). The song featured a "chair dance" that has become popular with the Korean public; it has since been upgraded to a "sofa dance".  The dance has been copied and parodied by many people, including Hyun Young, Infinity Challenge comedy team member No Hongchul, comedian Shin Bong-sun, and Lee Soo-young.

Her follow-up song in 2009, "Toyoilbamae" ("On a Saturday Night"), was a success. She then released her next EP, The Queen.

2011–present: "Lights and Shadows" and "Dripping Tears" comeback
Starting in 2011, Son starred in a drama called Lights and Shadows. It was first broadcast on November 28, 2011. She finished filming in June 2012, with the drama concluding on July 3, 2012. She also released an OST for the drama called "Everything" on January 10, 2012.

It was confirmed by Pledis Entertainment that Son would make a comeback in Korea sometime in the summer. Eventually, a representative from Pledis Entertainment stated that Son had finished recording her album and was in the midst of shooting photos for the album jacket. The album was pushed back before eventually being released on November 12, 2012. The lead single, "Dripping Tears", was produced by Brave Brothers. The album contained six songs, including the title track of the same name and a 'G. Remix version' of "Dripping Tears." The music video of "Dripping Tears" was released a day after the album. She first performed the song on November 15, on M Countdown.

Son's contract with Pledis Entertainment ended in June 2015. It was soon announced that Son had signed with KeyEast for her future activities.

In 2019, she starred in the romantic comedy thriller When the Camellia Blooms.

In September 2020, Son signed with new agency H& Entertainment after leaving KeyEast. In August 2022, Son renewed her contract with H& Entertainment.

Personal life
Son married former South Korean national speed skater Lee Kyou-hyuk on May 13, 2022 in a private ceremony. Their romantic relationship started in September 2021.

Discography

Studio albums

Compilation albums

Extended plays

Singles

Filmography

Film

Television series

Television show

Awards and nominations

References

External links 

 
  

1983 births
K-pop singers
Living people
South Korean women pop singers
21st-century South Korean actresses
South Korean film actresses
South Korean television actresses
21st-century South Korean singers
21st-century South Korean women singers
South Korean female idols